Richard Carr may refer to:

Richard Carr (field hockey) (1911–?), Indian Olympic field hockey player
Richard Carr (chaplain) (1925–2002), American Air Force chaplain
Richard Carr (businessman) (born 1938), English business executive and director of Arsenal Football Club
Richard Carr (blues musician), blues singer and guitarist from Canada
Richard Carr (historian) (born 1985), historian, political commentator and academic